Erhaia is a genus of small to minute freshwater snails with a gill and an operculum, aquatic gastropod mollusks in the family Amnicolidae.

Erhaia is the type genus of the tribe Erhaiini, which is now a synonym of  the subfamily Amnicolinae.

Erhaia (also within the tribe Erhaiini) was originally described as a genus within the Pomatiopsidae in 1985, but Wilke et al. (2000, 2001) moved it to the Amnicolidae.

Distribution 
The distribution of Erhaia includes southern China and India.  The center of biodiversity of Erhaia in China is located in  the provinces of Hunan, Hubei and Sichuan. Distribution also includes Fujian Province. There is also scattered occurrences of Erhaia in Yunnan Province. These snails live in the Yangtze River drainage and in the Mekong River drainage (1 species).

Description 
The length of the shell of this species is up to 3.9 mm.

Species
Species within the genus Erhaia include:
 Erhaia daliensis Davis & Kuo, 1985
 Erhaia gongjianguoi (Kang, 1983)
 Erhaia hubiensis (Liu, Zhang & Wang, 1983)
 Erhaia jianouensis (Liu & Zhang, 1979)
 Erhaia kunmingensis Davis & Kuo, 1985
 Erhaia lii (Kang)
 Erhaia nainitalensis Davis & Rao, 1997
 Erhaia robusta (Kang, 1986)
 Erhaia sheminensis
 Erhaia wangchuki Gittenberger, Sherub & Stelbrink, 2017
 Erhaia wantanensis
 Erhaia wufengensis

Synonyms:
 Erhaia chinensis Davis et al. 1985 and Erhaia chinensis Davis & Kang, 1995 are synonyms of Chencuia chinensis Liu & Zhang, 1979

Ecology 
Erhaia lives in streams in mountainous areas.

References

Amnicolidae